EagleBank Arena (originally the Patriot Center) is a 10,000-seat arena in the eastern United States, on the campus of George Mason University in Fairfax, Virginia, a suburb southwest of Washington, D.C.

EagleBank Arena has attracted 9.6 million people to over 2,958 events to GMU, which has over 30,000 students.

In 2010, the Patriot Center was ranked seventh nationwide and twelfth worldwide according to ticket sales for venues with capacities between 10,001 and 15,000 by trade publication Venues Today. Also in 2010, the Patriot Center was ranked No. 8 nationwide and No. 18 worldwide according to top grossing venues with a capacity between 10,001 and 15,000 by Billboard magazine.

On May 7, 2015, the university announced that the name would be changed on July 1 to "EagleBank Arena at George Mason University", following a partnership deal with EagleBank.

The Patriot Center is the first university venue to be managed by a private company, Monumental Sports & Entertainment, who also owns and manages Capital One Arena in Washington, D.C.

History
Financing for the construction of the Patriot Center was part of GMU's revenue bond package approved by the Virginia General Assembly in 1982. It replaced a 3,000-seat gymnasium.

The first use of the Patriot Center was GMU's graduation ceremonies in May 1985. The official opening of the arena was five months later on October 4, when the Washington Bullets hosted the New York Knicks in an NBA pre-season game, which was the professional debut of future hall of fame center Patrick Ewing, the first overall selection of the 1985 NBA draft out of nearby Georgetown University.

The NCAA men's volleyball tournament was held at the Patriot Center in May 1990. It hosted its first Colonial Athletic Association (CAA) men's basketball tournament in 1986 and its first women's tournament in 2005. During the 2010–11 season, GMU amassed a perfect 13–0 home record, which was the second time that occurred in three seasons.

The arena underwent a $10 million renovation, completed in 2009, that added new concession stands, hospitality area, locker rooms and bathrooms, and an improved main concourse.

Management history 
From its opening, the Patriot Center was managed by Abe Pollin's Washington Sports, later renamed to Washington Sports & Entertainment. In May 1999, Pollin sold 40% of Washington Sports to a partnership led by Ted Leonsis as part of a $200 million deal that also saw Leonsis purchase the Washington Capitals hockey team. Leonsis' group increased their ownership of Washington Sports to 44%  when they bought out minority owner Arnold Heft in January 2000.

Following Pollin's death in 2009, Leonsis purchased the rest of WSE from Pollin's heirs in 2010, and consolidated Washington Sports & Entertainment with his own Lincoln Holdings company to form Monumental Sports & Entertainment. Management of the Patriot Center passed to this successor company.

Renovations and recent events

On February 4, 2012, GMU men's basketball debuted a new center court scoreboard and set an attendance record against Old Dominion University on homecoming,    which then was reached again against James Madison University; both games were won by double digits. The Patriot Center also graduates many students of nearby Northern Virginia high schools.

The Patriot Center hosted the sold-out UFC Fight Night: Maynard vs. Diaz on January 11, 2010. That was the first time that the UFC had staged an event in the state of Virginia.

The arena also hosted a couple of games for the 2018 JBA season, despite not having a team representing the state of Virginia.

Due to renovations at Capital One Arena the Washington Mystics played Game 3 of the 2018 WNBA Finals at EagleBank Arena. The Seattle Storm won and it was the final game of the 2018 WNBA season.

Records
 Men's Basketball Game Attendance – 9,900 on February 4, 2012 vs Old Dominion University 
 Concert Attendance – Phish – 10,356
 Grossing Concert – Bruce Springsteen in 2005, $573,885
 Grossing Family Show – The Ringling Bros. and Barnum & Bailey Circus in 2009, $1.86 million
 Most Points Scored in Arena (Basketball) – 53 by Bobby Aguirre of Macalester College in 1995

See also
 List of NCAA Division I basketball arenas

References

External links

College basketball venues in the United States
College volleyball venues in the United States
George Mason Patriots basketball venues
Washington Wizards venues
Sports in Northern Virginia
Basketball venues in Virginia
Convention centers in Virginia
Mixed martial arts venues in the United States
Volleyball venues in the United States
Sports venues in the Washington metropolitan area
1985 establishments in Virginia